is a Japanese production company, which has produced anime and tokusatsu television programs, with minor work in motion pictures. It was founded in 1960 by the late TV producer Tomio Sagisu (also known as Soji Ushio). The company exists today as a stockholder. Perhaps their most famous creations are Osamu Tezuka's Ambassador Magma, one of the first tokusatsu series dubbed into English and aired in the United States, and the three series that make up the unique Lion-Maru franchise, featuring anthropomorphic lion samurai battling evil in feudal Japan. The company is currently owned by Shirō Sagisu, best known for composing scores for the Neon Genesis Evangelion series, and the 2016 Godzilla film, Shin Godzilla.

Selected productions

Anime
Zero-sen Hayato (1964)
Kurabu-kun no Bōken (1964, 1965) Unaired TV pilot
Harris no Kaze (1966)
Donkikko (1967)
Chibikko Kaiju Yadamon (1967)
Warera Salaryman Dô (1970)
Warera Salaryman Tou (1970)

Tokusatsu
Ambassador Magma (TV 1966–1967)
Jaguar Man (TV 1967) Unaired TV pilot
Hyouman (TV 1967) Unaired TV pilot
Gokemidoro (TV 1967)
Monster Prince (TV 1967–1968)
Goke, Body Snatcher from Hell (1968) - Special effects
Spectreman (TV 1971–1972)
Uchū Enjin Gori (1970) Unaired TV pilot
Kaiketsu Lion-Maru (TV 1972–1973)
Fuun Lion-Maru (TV 1973)
Tetsujin Tiger Seven (TV 1973–1974)
Denjin Zaborger (TV 1974–1975)
Bouken Rockbat (TV 1975)
Silver Jaguar (TV 1979, 1980) Unaired TV pilot
Lion-Maru G (TV 2006)

References

Sources

External links

Anime companies
Tokusatsu